The albums discography of Elvis Presley began in 1956 with the release of his self-titled debut album, Elvis Presley.

Guinness World Records recognizes him as the best-selling solo artist in the world, selling up to 1 billion records globally. Billboard ranks Presley as the 13th Greatest Artist of all Time. Music historian Joel Whitburn ranked Presley as the number 1 charting album artist of all time in the US. Elvis' Christmas Album remains the biggest selling holiday album of all time, selling over 20 million copies worldwide. According to the Recording Industry Association of America (RIAA), Presley has sold 146.5 million certified albums in the US, making him the third top-selling album artist in the country.

Albums

Studio albums

Soundtrack albums

Live albums

Spoken word albums

Compilation albums

Budget albums

Extended plays

Box set albums

Posthumous compilation albums

Remix albums

Follow That Dream Records

FTD (Follow That Dream), Sony Music's Official Elvis Presley Collectors label, was established in 1999 to serve the dedicated Elvis collector and to complement the commercial and artistic level of RCA's retail release schedule by issuing repertoire that is considered of interest to serious Elvis fans and collectors, material that is generally not part of mainstream RCA label releases to the public at large.
There are the original Collectors CDs with CDs ranging from soundboard-recorded concerts (recorded from the mixing desk in mono) to full RCA professionally recorded concerts in stereo and CDs consisting of unreleased material from recording sessions, such as The Jungle Room Sessions, Memphis Sessions, etc. Later FTD introduced the Elvis Classic Album Series, releases of the original albums in deluxe 7" size packaging with a booklet and usually a second CD of outtakes from the same period as the recordings on the album. There is also the Movie Soundtrack Series, usually released as a single CD but again in deluxe 7" packaging with booklet.

Notes

See also
List of songs recorded by Elvis Presley
Elvis Presley singles discography

References

Further reading
Guralnick, Peter and Jorgensen, Ernst (1999). Elvis: Day By Day - The Definitive Record of His Life and Music. New York: Ballantine Books. 
Jorgensen, Ernst (1998). Elvis Presley: A Life In Music - The Complete Recording Sessions. New York: St. Martin's Press.

External links
 
 Elvis The Music official music label site
 ElvisRecords.us The Elvis Presley Record Research Database

Country music discographies
 
Rock music discographies
Discographies of American artists